Jaques Sterne (29 June 1695 in Woodhouse – 9 June 1759 in Rise) was a cleric and politician in the mid 18th century.

He was educated at Jesus College, Cambridge. He was ordained in 1720. He held livings at Rise and Hornsea. He was Archdeacon of Cleveland from 1735 until 1750; and then of East Riding from 1750 until 1755. His Alumni Cantabrigienses entry describes him as a"A well known and eccentric figure in York- a violent Whig politician"

References

1695 births
18th-century English Anglican priests
Whig (British political party) politicians
Alumni of Jesus College, Cambridge
Archdeacons of Cleveland
Archdeacons of the East Riding
1759 deaths
Clergy from Sheffield
People from Handsworth, South Yorkshire